Richard J. Herrick (June 15, 1931 – March 14, 1963) was the world's first recipient of a successful human organ transplant. Herrick was diagnosed with Kidney Disease and was given little time to live. He received a kidney from his identical twin brother Ronald in an operation performed by Joseph Murray, Hartwell Harrison and Joseph Merrill in 1954. Herrick, age 23, was told of a Harvard Medical School professor experimenting with the idea of transplanting healthy organs into those whose organs had failed. On December 23, 1954 the surgery was done giving Richard one of Ronald's kidneys. After surgery he lived for 8 more years before dying of a heart attack.

References

1931 births
1963 deaths
Kidney transplant recipients
American twins